Lujo Bezeredi (also spelled Bezeredy, ; 1898 – April 20, 1979) was a Croatian-Hungarian sculptor and painter.

He was born in Nova, Kingdom of Hungary, to a Hungarian-Slovak father and a Croatian mother. After the death of his parents, he moved to Csáktornya (present day Čakovec, Croatia), where he completed his schooling at the public school and teacher's training school. He later studied at the College of Education in Budapest and enrolled the Academy of Fine Arts in Zagreb in 1922.

Between 1936 and 1941 he lived in Belgrade. As a material for sculptures he mostly used terra cotta, with engobe being his favourite pottery technique along with less frequently used faience and glazing techniques. His work is characterized by social motifs from urban and rural life. In 1942 he returned to Csáktornya, where he lived with his wife until his death.

Bezeredi donated his entire collection of 485 various works of art to the Međimurje County Museum in Čakovec. He is buried at the city cemetery in the same town.

External links
 Biography in the Croatian Biographical Lexicon (in Croatian)
 Bezeredi - renowned artist from Medjimurje

1898 births
1979 deaths
Croatian painters
Croatian sculptors
People from Čakovec
Hungarian sculptors
Vladimir Nazor Award winners
19th-century Croatian sculptors
20th-century Croatian sculptors
19th-century Hungarian sculptors
20th-century Hungarian painters
Hungarians of Croatia
History of Čakovec
Yugoslav painters